Atriplex suberecta is a species of saltbush known by the common names sprawling saltbush, lagoon saltbush and (in Britain and Ireland) Australian orache. It is native to Australia.

Distribution
It can be found on other continents as an introduced species and invasive species, including southern Africa and parts of North America. It is sometimes considered a noxious weed.

Description
This is an annual herb producing sprawling, scaly stems 20 to 60 centimeters long. The thin, toothed leaves are oval to diamond-shaped and up to 3 centimeters long. The male and female flowers are generally borne in axillary clusters.

References

External links
Jepson Manual Treatment
USDA Plants Profile
New South Wales Flora
Flora of North America

suberecta
Flora of New South Wales
Flora of the Northern Territory
Flora of Queensland
Flora of South Australia
Flora of Victoria (Australia)
Eudicots of Western Australia